Mongondow, or , is one of the Philippine languages spoken in Bolaang Mongondow Regency and neighbouring regencies of North Sulawesi (Celebes) and Gorontalo Provinces, Indonesia.

Phonology 
Mongondow has the following phoneme inventory:

The lateral  is pronounced as alveolar  when adjacent to the front vowels , . In all other environments, it is a retroflex .

Grammar

Pronouns
The personal pronouns are:

Numerals

References

Bibliography

External links

Website about Mongondow grammars

Gorontalo–Mongondow languages
Languages of Sulawesi